Khvajeh Jarrah (also Romanized as Khvājeh Jarrāḩ) is a village in Chenaran Rural District, in the Central District of Chenaran County, Razavi Khorasan Province, Iran. At the 2006 census, its population was 335, in 100 families.

References 

Populated places in Chenaran County